{{DISPLAYTITLE:C12H15NO4}}
The molecular formula C12H15NO4 (molar mass: 237.25 g/mol, exact mass: 237.1001 u) may refer to:

 Ethopabate
 5-Methoxymethylone (2-A1MP)
 N-lactoyl-phenylalanine (Lac-Phe)